Misleydis Díaz González (born 23 August 1988) is a Cuban retired female tennis player.

In her career, Díaz González won four doubles titles on the ITF Women's Circuit. On 14 November 2011, she reached her best singles ranking of world No. 861. On 10 October 2011, she peaked at No. 649 in the doubles rankings.

Playing for Cuba Fed Cup team, Díaz González accumulated a win–loss record of 5–4 in Fed Cup competitions.

ITF finals

Singles (0–2)

Doubles (4–0)

Fed Cup participation

Singles (4–4)

Doubles (1–0)

References

External links 
 
 
 

1988 births
Living people
Cuban female tennis players
Cuban sportspeople
Tennis players at the 2011 Pan American Games
Pan American Games competitors for Cuba
20th-century Cuban women
20th-century Cuban people
21st-century Cuban women